NKo is a Unicode block containing characters for the Manding languages of West Africa, including Bamanan, Jula, Maninka, Mandinka, and a common literary language, Kangbe, also called N'Ko.

N'Ko became part of Unicode with version 5.0 in July 2006. With Unicode 11.0 in June 2018, three additional characters were added: a combining mark for abbreviated units of measure and two currency symbols.

History
The following Unicode-related documents record the purpose and process of defining specific characters in the NKo block:

References 

Unicode blocks